Tinerfe is a genus of ctenophores belonging to the family Pleurobrachiidae.

Species:

Tinerfe coerulea 
Tinerfe cyanea

References

Tentaculata